Harikambhoji (pronounced harikāmbhōji) is a rāgam in Carnatic music (musical scale of South Indian classical music). It is the 28th Melakarta rāgam (parent scale) in the 72 melakarta rāgam system.

One of the first scales employed by the ancient Tamils (3rd century BCE) was the Mullaipann, a pentatonic scale composed of the notes sa ri ga pa da, equivalent to C, D, E, G and A in the western notations. These fully harmonic scales, constitutes the raga Mohanam in the Carnatic music style. Mullaipann further evolved into Sempaalai, a scale based on seven notes by the addition of two more notes, ma and ni to the pentatonic scale. Sempaalai pann corresponds to the Carnatic raga Harikambhoji.

Khamaj thaat of Hindustani Music is the equivalent to this rāgam. It is known as Harikedāragowla in the Muthuswami Dikshitar school of music.

In Western music, Mixolydian mode is this raga's equivalent.

Structure and Lakshana

It is the 4th rāgam in the 5th chakra Bana. The mnemonic name is Bana-Bhu. The mnemonic phrase is sa ri ga ma pa dha ni sa. Its  structure is as follows (see swaras in Carnatic music for details on below notation and terms):
 : 
 : 
(notes used in this scale are chatushruti rishabham, antara gandharam, shuddha madhyamam, chatushruti daivatam, kaishiki nishadham)

It is a sampoorna rāgam – rāgam having all 7 swarams. It is the shuddha madhyamam equivalent of Vachaspati, which is the 64th melakarta.

Janya rāgams 
Harikambhoji has a lot of janya rāgams (derived rāgams) associated with it, of which Kambhoji is by far the most famous and frequently sung in concerts. The globally famous pentatonic scale Mohanam is also considered a janya of this rāgam. Andolika (also considered as janya of Kharaharapriya), Kamas, Pashupatipriya,
Kedaragaula, Natakurinji, Navarasa kannada, Sahana, Senchuruti, Surutti  and Yadukula kambhoji are also very popular janyas.

See List of janya rāgams for a full list of Harikambhoji's janya rāgams.

Compositions 
Among the Trinity of Carnatic music, only Thyagaraja has composed songs in Harikambhoji. He has composed the popular kritis Ramanannu brovara, Entara Neethana, Nenendhu Vedakudhura, Enduku Nirdaya,  Undedi Ramudu, Chanithodi, Dinamani Vamsha amongst many others.

Papanasam Sivan has composed Enadhu manam kavalai, Pamalaikkinai Undo and Paadamalar Tunaiye which are popularly performed among other kritis.

Other popular compositions include:
Muruga Tirumal Maruga by Thanjavur Sankara Iyer, Saketha Nagara Natha by Mysore Sadashiva Rao, Rama na Moralincara by Walajapet Venkataramana Bhagavatar, Vinata Suta Vahanudai by KV Srinivasa Iyengar, Karomi smaranam shashanka-vadanam by Ashok R Madhav.

Film Songs

Language:Tamil

Language:Malayalam

Janya 28th:Kuntalavarali Ragam 
Ascending:S M1 P D2 N2 D2 S

Descending:S N2 D2 P M1 S

Film Songs:Tamil

Related rāgams
This section covers the theoretical and scientific aspect of this rāgam.

Harikambhoji's notes when shifted using Graha bhedam, yields 5 other major melakarta rāgams, namely, Kalyani, Sankarabharanam, Natabhairavi, Kharaharapriya and Hanumatodi. For further details and an illustration refer related rāgams section in Shankarabharanam page.

Notes

References

Melakarta ragas